The Never Find My Place Tour (originally announced as the Flux Tour) was the sixth concert tour by American singer-songwriter Poppy, staged in support of her fourth studio album, Flux. The tour began on March 8, 2022, in Sacramento, California and ended prematurely on November 29, 2022, in Manchester, England after the singer announced she was too ill to perform the final Glasgow and Amsterdam shows.

Background 
The tour was first announced under the name "Flux Tour" and would've taken place between September 2021 and February 2022. However, days before the tour would've begun, the artist announced via Twitter that it had been cancelled due to logistical issues caused by the COVID-19 pandemic. Rescheduled dates were announced in January 2022, with the name being changed to the "Never Find My Place Tour".

In May 2022, it was announced that Poppy would be an opening act for The Smashing Pumpkins' Spirits on Fire Tour along with Jane's Addiction. Along with this, the Europe dates for the Never Find My Place Tour would be postponed as it had caused a scheduling conflict.

The show on May 26, 2022, at House of Blues San Diego was recorded and livestreamed via Veeps on a 2-hour delay.

In November 2022, weeks before the beginning of the leg, Poppy announced the cancellation of the rest of the tour's European dates via Instagram Stories, except for those in the United Kingdom and the Netherlands, citing "…the current climate of the world and the difficulty it presents to touring musicians…". Eventually, the Glasgow and Amsterdam dates were cancelled as well after Poppy fell ill.

Set list 
This is the set list for the opening night in Sacramento, California, and is not meant to represent every show of the tour. Poppy performed six songs each from Flux and I Disagree, two from Eat (NXT Soundtrack), one each from Am I a Girl?, Choke and Stagger and a cover.

 "Lessen the Damage"
 "X"
 "Scary Mask"
 "Bloodmoney"
 "Concrete"
 "Sit / Stay"
 "Flux"
 "All the Things She Said" (T.A.T.u. cover)
 "Her"
 "Breeders"
 "Stagger"
 "CUE"
 "Anything Like Me"
 "Hysteria"
 "As Strange as It Seems"
 "Never Find My Place"
Encore
 "I Disagree"
 "Bite Your Teeth"

Tour dates

Cancelled shows

Notes

References 

2022 concert tours
Concert tours of North America
Concert tours of Europe
Concert tours of the United States
Concert tours of Canada
Concert tours of the United Kingdom